
Lac de Moron is a reservoir formed by damming the river Doubs on the border of France and Switzerland. It can be reached from Les Planchettes or Les Brenets in the Canton of Neuchâtel (Switzerland) and from Le Barboux in the Doubs department (France).

The arch dam Châtelot was completed in 1953.

See also
List of lakes of Switzerland

External links

Lakes of Doubs
Reservoirs in Switzerland
Reservoirs in France
Moron
Lac De Moron
International lakes of Europe
RMoron